Carina Meidele (born 18 April 1965 in Krefeld, Germany) is a former German curler.

Teams

References

External links
 

Living people
1965 births
Sportspeople from Krefeld
German female curlers
Curlers at the 1998 Winter Olympics
Olympic curlers of Germany
European curling champions
German curling champions